Spiro Mounds (34 LF 40) is an archaeological site located in present-day eastern Oklahoma that remains from an indigenous Indian culture that was part of the major northern Caddoan Mississippian culture. The 80-acre site is located within a floodplain on the southern side of the Arkansas River. The modern town of Spiro developed approximately seven miles to the south. 
 
Between the ninth and fifteenth centuries, the local indigenous people created a powerful religious and political center, culturally linked to the Southeastern Ceremonial Complex identified by anthropologists as the Mississippian Ideological Interaction Sphere (MIIS). Spiro was a major western outpost of Mississippian culture, which dominated the Mississippi Valley and its tributaries for centuries.

In the 1930s during the Great Depression, treasure hunters bought the rights to tunnel into Craig Mound—the second-largest mound on the site—to mine it for artifacts. Without concern for scientific research, they exposed a hollow burial chamber inside the mound, a unique feature containing some of the most extraordinary pre-Columbian artifacts ever found in the United States. The treasure hunters sold the artifacts they recovered to art collectors, some as far away as Europe. The artifacts included works of fragile, perishable materials: textiles and feathers that had been uniquely preserved in the conditions of the closed chamber. 

Later, steps were taken to protect the site. This site has been significant for North American archaeology since the 1930s, especially due to its many preserved textiles and a wealth of shell carving. Later, some of the artifacts sold by treasure hunters were returned to regional museums and the Caddo Nation, but many artifacts from the site have never been accounted for. 

Since the late twentieth century, the Spiro Mounds site has been protected by the Oklahoma Historical Society and it is listed on the National Register of Historic Places.

Chronology
Typically, the history of the Spiro culture is divided into archaeological phases:
 Evans Phase (900–1050 CE)
 Harlan Phase (1050–1250 CE)
 Norman Phase (1250–1350 CE)
 Spiro phase (1350–1450 CE)

Residential construction at Spiro decreased dramatically around 1250, and the people resettled in nearby villages, such as the Choates-Holt Site to the north. Spiro continued to be used as a ceremonial and mortuary center through 1450. The mound area was abandoned about 1450, but nearby communities persisted until 1600. 

The historic cultures following in the wake of Spiro, such as the Caddo, Pawnee, and Wichita peoples, were less complex and hierarchical.

Mounds and plaza area

Mississippian culture spread along the lower Mississippi River and its tributaries between the ninth and sixteenth centuries. The largest Mississippian settlement was Cahokia, the capital of a major chiefdom that built a six-mile-square city east of the Mississippi River that now is St. Louis, Missouri, in present-day southern Illinois. 

Archeological studies have revealed that Mississippian culture extended from the Great Lakes to the Gulf Coast, along the Ohio River, and into both the lowland and mountain areas of the Southeast. Mississippian settlements were known for their large earthwork, platform mounds (usually truncated pyramids), surmounted by temples, the houses of warrior kings and priests, and the burial houses of the elite. The mounds were arranged around large, constructed flat plazas believed to be used for ceremonial community gathering and ritual games. Archaeological research has shown that Mississippian settlements such as Cahokia and Spiro took part in a vast trading network that covered the eastern half of what is now the U.S. and parts of what is now the western U.S. as well.

The Spiro site includes twelve earthen mounds and 150 acres of land. As in other Mississippian-culture towns, the people built a number of large, complex earthworks. These included mounds surrounding a large, planned and leveled central plaza, where important religious rituals, the politically and culturally significant game of chunkey, and other important community activities were carried out. The population lived in a village that bordered the plaza. In addition, archaeologists have found more than twenty related village sites within five miles of the main town.

Spiro has been the site of human activity for at least 8,000 years. It was a major Mississippian settlement from 800 to 1450 AD. The cultivation of maize during this period allowed accumulation of crop surpluses and the gathering of more dense populations. The town was the headquarters of a regional chiefdom, whose powerful leaders directed the building of eleven platform mounds and one burial mound in an  area on the south bank of the Arkansas River. The heart of the site is a group of nine mounds surrounding an oval plaza. These mounds were the bases of the homes of important leaders or formed the foundations for religious structures that focused the attention of the community.

Brown Mound, the largest platform mound, is located on the eastern side of the plaza. It had an earthen ramp that gave access to the summit from the northern side. Here, atop Brown Mound and the other mounds, the inhabitants of the town carried out complex rituals, centered especially on the deaths and burials of Spiro's powerful rulers.

Archaeologists have shown that Spiro had a large resident population until about 1250. After that, most of the population moved to other towns nearby. Spiro continued to be used as a regional ceremonial center and burial ground until about 1450. Its ceremonial and mortuary functions continued and seem to have increased after the main population moved away.

The Great Mortuary 

Craig Mound – also called "The Spiro Mound" – is the second-largest mound on the site and the only burial mound. The conditions in this hollow space were so favorable that objects made of perishable materials such as basketry, woven fabric of plant and animal fibers, lace, fur, and feathers were preserved inside it. In historic tribes, such objects have traditionally been created by women. Also found inside were several examples of Mississippian stone statuary made from Missouri flint clay and Mill Creek chert bifaces, all thought to have originally come from the Cahokia site in Illinois.

The "Great Mortuary", as archaeologists called this hollow chamber, appears to have begun as a burial structure for Spiro's rulers. It was created as a circle of sacred cedar posts sunk in the ground and angled together at the top similarly to a tipi. The cone-shaped chamber was covered with layers of earth to create the mound, preventing collapse. Some scholars believe that minerals percolating through the mound hardened the log walls of the chamber, making them resistant to decay and shielding the perishable artifacts inside from direct contact with the earth. No other Mississippian mound has been found with such a hollow space inside it, nor with such spectacular preservation of artifacts. Craig Mound has been called "an American King Tut's Tomb".

Between 1933 and 1935, Craig Mound was excavated by a commercial enterprise that had bought the rights from local landowners to excavate and to keep or sell the artifacts they recovered. Tunneling into the mound and breaking through the Great Mortuary's log wall, they found many human burials, together with their associated grave goods. They discarded the human remains and the fragile artifacts—made of textile, basketry, and even feathers—that were preserved in these extremely unusual conditions. Most of those rare and priceless objects disintegrated before scholars could reach the site, although some were sold to collectors. When the commercial excavators finished, they dynamited the burial chamber and sold the commercially valuable artifacts, made of stone, pottery, copper, and conch shell, to collectors in the United States and overseas. Probably, most of these valuable objects are lost, but some have been returned through donation and have been documented by scholars.

Funded by the Works Progress Administration (WPA), archaeologists from the University of Oklahoma excavated parts of the site between 1936 and 1941. The Oklahoma Historical Society established the Spiro Mounds Archaeological Center in 1978 that continues to operate. The site is listed on the National Register of Historic Places and is preserved as Oklahoma's only Archeological State Park and only pre-contact Native American site open to the public.

Southeastern Ceremonial Complex

Spiro Mounds people participated in what cultural anthropologists and archaeologists call the Southeastern Ceremonial Complex (SECC), a network of ceremonial centers sharing the Mississippian culture and similar spiritual beliefs, cosmology, ritual practices, and cult objects. The complex was a vast trading network that distributed exotic materials from all across North America that were used in the making of ritual objects. These materials included colored flint from New Mexico, copper from the Great Lakes, conch (or lightning whelk) shells from the Gulf Coast, and mica from the Carolinas. Other Mississippian centers also traded in these prized resources, but apparently, Spiro was the only trading center that acquired obsidian from Mexico. Using these valued materials, Mississippian artists created exquisite works of art reflecting their cultural identity and their complex spiritual beliefs.

When commercial excavators dug into Craig Mound in the 1930s, they found many beautifully crafted ritual artifacts, including stone effigy pipes, polished stone maces, finely made flint knives and arrow points, polished chunkey stones, copper effigy axes, Mississippian copper plates (Spiro plates), mica effigy cut outs, elaborately engraved conch shell ornaments, pearl bead necklaces, stone earspools, wood carvings inlaid with shell, and specially made mortuary pottery. The conch shells were fashioned into gorgets and drinking cups engraved with intricate designs representing costumed humans, real and mythical animals, and geometric motifs, all of which had profound symbolic significance. The Spiro Mounds ceremonial objects are among the finest examples of pre-Columbian art in North America.

Later, archaeologists recognized that the ritual artifacts at Spiro were similar to comparable objects excavated at other powerful Mississippian towns that also participated in the Southeastern Ceremonial Complex. These include Cahokia in Illinois, the largest Mississippian town; Etowah and Ocmulgee in Georgia; and Moundville in Alabama. In economic terms, Spiro seems to have been a gateway town that funneled valuable resources from the Great Plains and other western regions to the main Mississippian ceremonial centers farther east. In return, it received valuable goods from those other centers. Spiro's location on the Arkansas River, one of the  principal tributaries of the Mississippi River, gave the Spiro traders access to the Mississippian heartland.

Spiro and other Mississippian towns clearly looked to the great city of Cahokia, in what now is southern Illinois, as a cultural model to be emulated. Located about 400 miles northeast of Spiro near the confluence of the Mississippi and Missouri Rivers, Cahokia was the largest and most impressive of all the Mississippian towns. Mineralogical analysis of some of the most beautiful stone effigy pipes found at Spiro, including the famous "Grizzly Man" or "Kneeling Rattler" pipe, have shown they came from Cahokia, based on the material from which they were made. Cahokia also influenced the styles of the artifacts made at Spiro. Archaeologists have identified four distinct styles: the Braden Style characteristic of artifacts brought from Cahokia and the Craig A, B, and C styles that are local derivatives of the Braden Style.

Antonio Waring and Preston Holder first defined the Southeastern Ceremonial Complex in the 1940s, according to a series of distinct cultural traits. Since the late 1980s, archaeologists have adopted a new classification scheme that is based on their greatly improved understanding of Mississippian cultural development. The new scheme divides the SECC into five periods, or horizons, each defined by the appearance of new ritual objects and cultural motifs connected with new developments in politics and long-distance trade. Archaeologists have determined that Spiro was at the peak of its cultural importance in the thirteenth and fourteenth centuries.

Mississippian iconography

Anthropologists have tried in recent years to interpret the meaning of the ritual artifacts and artistic imagery found at Spiro and other Mississippian sites. While reaching firm conclusions about the meanings of works of art made centuries ago by people of an extinct culture is difficult, they have made some compelling interpretations by comparing Mississippian artistic imagery with the myths, religious rituals, art, and iconography of historic Native American groups.

One of the most prominent symbols at Spiro is the "Birdman", a winged human figure representing a warrior or chunkey player. Chunkey was a game played in the Mississippian period, but also in historic times by the Choctaw, Chickasaw, Cherokee, and other tribes throughout the Eastern Woodlands. Based upon these historic records, the game consisted of players rolling a stone disk for a considerable distance and then hurling spears as close as they could to the point where the stone stopped.

Another Spiro icon is the "Great Serpent", a being said to inhabit the Under World, the spiritual domain on the opposite side of the Mississippian universe. The Great Serpent is portrayed in Mississippian art with a serpent's body, but also with wings or horns. Similar beings were the subject of myth in historic times among the Micmac, Huron, Kickapoo, Cherokee, Muscogee Creek, Caddo, and other Native American tribes, appearing in tribes of at least three major language families. The spiritual beings of the Under World were thought to be in constant opposition to those in the Upper World. Humans had to fear these beings, according to Native American mythology, but they could also gain great power from them in certain circumstances.

Mississippian art also features the cedar tree or striped-center-pole motifs, which researchers have interpreted as the axis mundi, the point at which the three parts of the Mississippian spiritual universe come together: the Upper World, the Under World, and the Middle World where humans dwell. Often, the cedar tree, or the striped-center-pole, is found on engraved conch shell gorgets, with human or animal figures positioned on either side. The concept of an axis mundi — the point where different cosmic domains converge — is found in many cultures around the world. It is frequently represented as a tree (including the Tree of Life), since trees pass through the surface of the earth and connect the subsurface and the sky. The fact that the Great Mortuary at Spiro was built with cedar (or cedar elm) posts suggests that the burial chamber was meant to be a point of departure from one spiritual domain to another, as cedar was a sacred wood.

Archaeologists found that one of the conch shell cups from Craig Mound had a black residue in the bottom. This suggests that the Spiro people may have practiced a version of the Black Drink Ceremony, a purification ritual that was also performed in historic times by their descendants - the southeastern tribes. Participants drank a tea made from the Yaupon Holly from conch shell cups.

Caddoan Mississippians

Most authorities agree that the people of Spiro were Caddoan speaking, but their descendants in historic times are difficult to identify. Anthropologists speculate that the Caddo Confederacy, Wichita, Kichai, or non-Caddoan Tunica, could be their descendants. However, the cultures of all these peoples, when encountered by the Spanish and French in the sixteenth and seventeenth centuries, were substantially different from that of Spiro.

Under the Native American Graves Protection and Repatriation Act, the Caddo Nation of Oklahoma and the Wichita and Affiliated Tribes (Wichita, Keechi, Waco and Tawakonie) are recognized by the U.S. Federal government, cultural anthropologists, and archaeologists as the cultural descendants of the builders of Spiro Mounds.

When the Spanish conquistador Hernando de Soto led a military expedition into what is now the southeastern United States in the 1540s, he encountered Native American groups including the Tula people, who lived near the Arkansas River. de Soto's forces also encountered numerous Caddo villages. Composed of many tribes, the Caddo were organized into three confederacies, the Hasinai, Kadohadacho, and Natchitoches, which were all linked by similar languages.

At the time of de Soto's conquest, the Caddoan peoples occupied a large territory. It included what now is eastern Oklahoma, western Arkansas, northeastern Texas, and northwestern Louisiana. Anthropologists have thought that the Caddo and related peoples had been living in the region for centuries and that they had their own local variant of Mississippian culture.

Recent excavations have revealed more cultural diversity than scholars had expected within that region. The sites along the Arkansas River, in particular, seem to have their own distinctive characteristics. Scholars still classify the Mississippian sites found in the entire Caddo area, including Spiro Mounds, as "Caddoan Mississippian".

The Caddoan Mississippian region contained many towns in addition to Spiro, including the Battle Mound Site. Scholars have determined that Battle Mound, lying along the Great Bend of the Red River in southwest Arkansas, was a larger site than Spiro. Little excavation has been conducted there to date. The Caddoan Mississippian towns had a more irregular layout of earthen mounds and associated villages than did towns in the Middle Mississippian heartland to the east. They also lacked the wooden palisade fortifications often found in the major Middle Mississippian towns. Living on the western edge of the Mississippian world, the Caddoan may have faced fewer military threats from their neighbors. Also, their societies may have had a somewhat lower level of social stratification.

The Spiro people probably were speakers of one of the many Caddoan languages. The Caddoan languages once had a broad geographic distribution, but many are now extinct. The modern languages in the Caddoan family include Caddo, Wichita, Kitsai, Pawnee, and Arikara languages. Wichita and Kitsai are both extinct.

Museum complex
The Spiro Mounds are located within the Spiro Mounds Archaeological Center complex in Fort Coffee, Oklahoma. The center features various exhibits and trails, and it offers tours, including a virtual tour.

See also
 Mississippian culture
 Cahokia
 Southeastern Ceremonial Complex
 Caddoan Mississippian culture
 Mississippian stone statuary
 Mississippian copper plates
 Shell gorgets
 List of Mississippian sites

References

Further reading
Brown, James Allison & Alice Brues. The Spiro Ceremonial Center: The Archaeology of Arkansas Valley Caddoan Culture in Eastern Oklahoma, Ann Arbor: Museum of Anthropology, University of Michigan, 1996.
Hamilton, Henry, Jean Tyree Hamilton, & Eleanor Chapman. Spiro Mound Copper, Columbia, MO: Missouri Archaeological Society, 1974.
Hudson, Charles M. (ed.).  Black Drink: A Native American Tea, Athens, GA: University of Georgia Press, 2004.
La Vere, David.  Looting Spiro Mounds: An American King Tut's Tomb, Norman, OK: University of Oklahoma Press, 2007.
Merriam, Larry & Christopher Meriam. The Spiro Mound, A Photo Essay: Photographs from the Collection of Dr. Robert E. Bell, Oklahoma City: Merriam Station Books, 2004.
Pauketat, Timothy R. The Ascent of Chiefs: Cahokia and Mississippian Politics in Native North America, Tuscaloosa, AL: University of Alabama, 1994.
Pauketat, Timothy R.  Ancient Cahokia and the Mississippians, London: Cambridge University Press, 2004.
Pauketat, Timothy R. and Thomas E. Emerson (eds.). Cahokia: Domination and Ideology in the Mississippian World, Lincoln: University of Nebraska Press: 1997.
Phillips, Philip & James Allison Brown. Pre-Columbian Shell Engravings from the Craig Mound at Spiro, Oklahoma, Cambridge, Massachusetts: Peabody Museum Press, 1984.
Reilly, F. Kent and James F. Garber (eds.).  Ancient Objects and Sacred Realms: Interpretations of Mississippian Iconography, Austin, TX: University of Texas Press, 2007.
Townsend, Richard F.  Hero, Hawk, and Open Hand: American Indian Art of the Ancient Midwest and South, Chicago, IL: Art Institute of Chicago, 2004.

External links

Spiro Mounds on Oklahoma Historical Society
Spiro Mounds Archaeological Center on TravelOK.com Official travel and tourism website for the State of Oklahoma
Spiro Mounds Information & Videos - Chickasaw.TV
Arkansas Antiquities
Spiro and the Arkansas Basin
Encyclopedia of Oklahoma History and Culture
Oklahoma Archeological Survey
Southernhistory.com
 Spiromound.com
Destruction of Craig Mound
Spiro Mounds Bibliography
Caddoan Mississippian Culture
"Towns and Temples of the Mississippian Culture" (animation video)
The Spiro Mounds Site

Caddoan Mississippian culture
Mounds in the United States
Native American history of Oklahoma
Native American museums in Oklahoma
Museums in Le Flore County, Oklahoma
Archaeological museums in Oklahoma
Archaeological sites on the National Register of Historic Places in Oklahoma
Caddo
Protected areas of Le Flore County, Oklahoma
Parks in Oklahoma
Historic American Landscapes Survey in Oklahoma
Oklahoma Historical Society
National Register of Historic Places in Le Flore County, Oklahoma